While My Lady Sleeps is an album by American jazz pianist Phineas Newborn Jr. with Dennis Farnon and His Orchestra recorded in 1957 and released on the RCA Victor label.

Reception
The Allmusic review by Scott Yanow states "Although not as vital as his usual trio dates and Farnon's string arrangements are not too inspiring, the music is pleasing and finds Newborn in his early prime".

Track listing
 "Moonlight in Vermont" (John Blackburn, Karl Suessdorf) – 5:06 
 "Don't You Know I Care (Or Don't You Care to Know)" (Mack David, Duke Ellington) – 5:05 
 "Lazy Mood" (Eddie Miller, Johnny Mercer) – 5:22 
 "I'm Old Fashioned" (Jerome Kern, Mercer) – 3:57
 "Black Is the Color of My True Love's Hair" (Traditional) – 4:05
 "While My Lady Sleeps" (Bronisław Kaper, Gus Kahn) – 6:12
 "It's Easy to Remember" (Lorenz Hart, Richard Rodgers) – 5:02
 "Bali Ha'i" (Oscar Hammerstein II, Richard Rodgers) – 4:21
 "If I Should Lose You" (Ralph Rainger, Leo Robin) – 5:48

Personnel
Phineas Newborn Jr. – piano
George Joyner – bass
Alvin Stoller – drums  
Victor Arno, Len Atkins, Israel Baker, Jack Gasselin, Benny Gill, Henry Hill, Carl LaMagna, Marvin Limonick, Dan Lube, Alfred Lustgarten, Ralph Shaeffer, Jerry Vinci, Eunice Wennermark – violin
Cecil Figelski, Al Harshman, Abraham Hochstein, Harry Hymans, Lou Kievman, Joe Reilich, George Neikrug – viola
Ray Kramer, Ed Lustgarten, George Neikrug – cello
Dennis Farnon – arranger, conductor

References

RCA Records albums
Phineas Newborn Jr. albums
1957 albums